Platylomalus oceanitis, is a species of clown beetle found in many Oriental countries including India, Sri Lanka, Indonesia, Philippines and Australia.

References 

Histeridae
Insects of Sri Lanka
Insects described in 1855